Guingamp-Paimpol Agglomération (full name: Guingamp-Paimpol Agglomération de l'Armor à l'Argoat) is the communauté d'agglomération, an intercommunal structure, centred on the towns of Guingamp and Paimpol. It is located in the Côtes-d'Armor department, in the Brittany region, northwestern France. Created in 2017, its seat is in Guingamp. Its area is 1,107.7 km2. Its population was 73,427 in 2019.

Composition
The communauté d'agglomération consists of the following 57 communes:

Bégard
Belle-Isle-en-Terre
Bourbriac
Brélidy
Bulat-Pestivien
Calanhel
Callac
Carnoët
La Chapelle-Neuve
Coadout
Duault
Grâces
Guingamp
Gurunhuel
Kerfot
Kerien
Kermoroc'h
Kerpert
Landebaëron
Lanleff
Lanloup
Loc-Envel
Lohuec
Louargat
Maël-Pestivien
Magoar
Moustéru
Pabu
Paimpol
Pédernec
Pléhédel
Plésidy
Ploëzal
Ploubazlanec
Plouëc-du-Trieux
Plouézec
Plougonver
Plouisy
Ploumagoar
Plourac'h
Plourivo
Plusquellec
Pont-Melvez
Pontrieux
Quemper-Guézennec
Runan
Saint-Adrien
Saint-Agathon
Saint-Clet
Saint-Laurent
Saint-Nicodème
Saint-Servais
Senven-Léhart
Squiffiec
Tréglamus
Trégonneau
Yvias

References

Guingamp-Paimpol
Guingamp-Paimpol